The Golden Age of Apocalypse is the debut studio album by Thundercat, released on Brainfeeder in 2011.

Critical reception
At Metacritic, which assigns a weighted average score out of 100 to reviews from mainstream critics, The Golden Age of Apocalypse received an average score of 80% based on 21 reviews, indicating "generally favorable reviews".

It was listed by Sean J. O'Connell of LA Weekly as one of the "Top 5 Los Angeles Jazz Albums of 2011".

Track listing

Charts

References

External links
 

2011 debut albums
Albums produced by Flying Lotus
Albums produced by Thundercat (musician)
Brainfeeder albums
Thundercat (musician) albums